Grober may refer to:

 Punta Grober, mountain part of the Monte Rosa Alps in the Pennine Alps, Italy
 Khayele Grober (1898 - 1978), theatre actor and playwright

See also 

 Groeber